The Moscow metropolitan area or Moscow capital region is the largest metropolitan area in Russia as well as in Europe, with a population of around 21.5 million. It consists of the city of Moscow and surrounding areas in Moscow Oblast.

The related term Moscow region is used unofficially to describe Moscow and Moscow Oblast together. However, formally, they are two separate federal subjects.

Structure and population estimation 

Moscow metropolitan area includes the city of Moscow, population 12,197,596, a ring of cities annexed to it and administered within (Balashikha, Korolyov, Krasnogorsk, Khimki, Mytishchi and Zelenograd), as well as large nearby towns with population of over 100,000 citizens (Reutov, Zheleznodorozhny, Podolsk and Lubertsy, to name a few) that fall under regional administration. Administratively, all those towns are a part of the Moscow Oblast. The metropolitan area has thus no coordinated administration structures, and no official population statistics.

The population of the Moscow region is the sum of populations of the city (13,010,112) and surrounding oblast (8,524,665),coming to 21,534,777 – about 14% of the entire Russian population.

Economy 

, the GMP of Moscow metropolitan area was ₽25 trillion (US$330 billion). 
Nominal GMP per capita was around ₽1.2 million (US$16,000).

References 

Metropolitan areas of Russia
Geography of Moscow
Regions of Russia